Peter William Marsh (born December 21, 1956) is a Canadian former professional ice hockey player.

Career 
Marsh played 230 games in the World Hockey Association and 278 games in the National Hockey League. He played for the Winnipeg Jets, Cincinnati Stingers, and Chicago Black Hawks.

Personal life 
Marsh has two children. His son, Adam, played with the Saint John Sea Dogs, Val-d'Or Foreurs and Charlottetown Islanders of the Quebec Major Junior Hockey League.

Career statistics

Regular season and playoffs

International

External links

1956 births
Living people
Canadian ice hockey left wingers
Chicago Blackhawks players
Cincinnati Stingers draft picks
Cincinnati Stingers players
Sherbrooke Castors players
Sportspeople from Halifax, Nova Scotia
Springfield Indians players
Pittsburgh Penguins draft picks
Winnipeg Jets (1979–1996) players
Ice hockey people from Nova Scotia

References